
911 (CMXI) was a common year starting on Tuesday (link will display the full calendar) of the Julian calendar.

Events 
 By place 

 Europe 
 September 24 — King Louis IV (the Child), the last ruler of the Carolingian Dynasty, dies at Frankfurt am Main after an 11-year reign. The East Frankish dukes elect Conrad I at Forchheim as the king of the East Frankish Kingdom. Charles III is elected as king of Lotharingia. Conrad is chosen through the influence of Louis' guardian and regent, Hatto I, archbishop of Mainz.
 Autumn – King Charles III (the Simple) and Rollo, leader of the Vikings, sign a peace agreement (Treaty of Saint-Clair-sur-Epte). In return for his homage and conversion to Christianity, Rollo becomes a vassal and is made Count of Rouen; this is the beginning of the duchy of Normandy. He divides the lands between the rivers Epte and Risle among his chieftains, and prevents any other Vikings sailing up the Seine to attack the West Frankish Kingdom.
 The Hungarians cross Bavaria, and invade Swabia and Franconia. They plunder the territories from Minfeld to Aargau. After that, they cross the Rhine, and attack Burgundy for the first time. 
 The Fatimids begin the conquest of Sicily, over their Aghlabid archrivals. Fatimid Sicilian governor Ibn al-Khinzir raids the south Italian coast (approximate date).

 Britain 
 Lord Æthelred of Mercia dies. He is buried in St. Oswald's Priory at Gloucester and is succeeded by his wife, Princess Æthelflæd, as Lady of the Mercians. Her brother, King Edward the Elder, insists on taking control of London and Oxford.

 Africa 
 A rebellion of the Kutama Berbers against the Fatimid Caliphate occurs. The Kutama tribesmen were previously the main supporters of the Shi'ite regime.

 By topic 
 Religion 
 April 14 – Pope Sergius III dies at Rome after a 7-year reign. He is succeeded by Anastasius III as the 120th pope of the Catholic Church.

Births 
 Hassan ibn Ali Kalbi, Fatimid emir (d. 964)
 Fan Zhi, chancellor of the Song Dynasty (d. 964)
 Gozlin, count of the Ardennes
 Minamoto no Shitagō, Japanese waka poet (d. 983)
 Willa of Tuscany, queen consort of Italy (or 912)
 Yelü Lihu, prince of the Khitan Empire (d. 960)

Deaths 
 February 28 – Abu Abdallah al-Shi'i, Muslim Shia imam
 April 4 – Liu Yin, governor of Southern Han (b. 874)
 April 14 – Sergius III, pope of the Catholic Church
 August 18 – Al-Hadi ila'l-Haqq Yahya, first Zaydi Imam of Yemen (b. 859)
 Æthelred, lord of Mercia and husband of Æthelflæd
 Burchard I, Frankish nobleman
 Ibn al-Rawandi, Muslim scholar and writer (b. 827)
 Louis IV, king of the East Frankish Kingdom (b. 893)
 Lu Yanchang, Chinese governor (jiedushi)
 Tecpancaltzin Iztaccaltzin, ruler of the Toltec Empire 
 Wifred II, count of Barcelona

References